Georgios Vourexakis (born 1 April 1977) is a retired Greek football midfielder.

References

1977 births
Living people
Greek footballers
Apollon Smyrnis F.C. players
Ionikos F.C. players
Kavala F.C. players
Platanias F.C. players
Aris Limassol FC players
Super League Greece players
Cypriot First Division players
Association football midfielders
Greek expatriate footballers
Expatriate footballers in Cyprus
Greek expatriate sportspeople in Cyprus